Facundo Mater (born 23 July 1998) is an Argentine professional footballer who plays as a midfielder for Barracas Central on loan from Argentinos Juniors.

Career
Mater's senior career started with Nueva Chicago in June 2016, when he was an unused substitute for a Primera B Nacional encounter with Los Andes. His professional football debut subsequently arrived in the 2016–17 campaign against Argentinos Juniors, which preceded further appearances that season versus Instituto, Chacarita Juniors and San Martín. Mater was selected seventeen more times in 2017–18.

Career statistics
.

References

External links

1998 births
Living people
Place of birth missing (living people)
Argentine footballers
Association football midfielders
Primera Nacional players
Nueva Chicago footballers
Argentinos Juniors footballers
Club Almirante Brown footballers
Barracas Central players
Argentine people of German descent